B4U Movies is a Free to Air Indian movie digital TV channel based in Mumbai available on more than 8 different satellites, in more than 100 countries including the US, UK, Europe, Middle East, Africa, Mauritius, Canada, and India. The channel broadcasts a mixture of classic and contemporary Hindi films.

There are 4 different versions of the channel available in the UK, North America, the Middle East and South Asia. Each version of the channel produces a quantity of local programming which reflects the culture and tastes of the local population of the Indian Diaspora. One such program (only shown on the South Asian version of B4U movies) is a talent contest for young actors, directors and screenwriters aged 7–15. The show concluded with the 4 finalists of the contest having their debut films premiered on the channel.

See also
 ATN B4U Movies
 B4U Films

References

External links
 Official site
 B4U movies live streaming FTA

Television stations in Mumbai
Television channels and stations established in 1999
British Indian mass media
Movie channels in the United Kingdom
Movie channels in India
Bollywood-based movie channels
Hindi cinema
1999 establishments in Maharashtra